Eurata hilaris is a moth of the subfamily Arctiinae. It was described by Zerny in 1937.

References

 Natural History Museum Lepidoptera generic names catalog

Arctiinae
Moths described in 1937